George Julian Harney (17 February 1817 – 9 December 1897) was a British political activist, journalist, and Chartist leader.  He was also associated with Marxism, socialism, and universal suffrage.

Early life
George Julian Harney, the son of a seaman, was born in Deptford in south-east London. When Harney was eleven he entered the Boy's Naval School at Greenwich. However, instead of pursuing a career in the navy he became a shop-boy for Henry Hetherington, the editor of the Poor Man's Guardian. Harney was imprisoned three times for selling this unstamped newspaper.

This experience radicalised Harney and although he was initially a member of the London Working Men's Association he became impatient with the organization’s failure to make much progress in the efforts to obtain universal suffrage. Harney was influenced by the more militant ideas of William Benbow, James Bronterre O'Brien and Feargus O'Connor.

In January 1837 Harney became one of the founders of the openly republican East London Democratic Association. Soon afterwards Harney became convinced of William Benbow's theory that a Grand National Holiday (a General strike) would result in an uprising and a change in the political system.

Involvement with Chartist movement
At the Chartist Convention held during the summer of 1839, Harney and William Benbow convinced the delegates to call a Grand National Holiday on 12 August. Feargus O'Connor argued against the plan but was defeated. Harney and Benbow toured the country in an attempt to persuade workers to join the strike. When Harney and Benbow were both arrested and charged with making seditious speeches, the General Strike was called off. Harney was kept in Warwick Gaol but when he appeared at Birmingham Assizes the grand jury refused to indict him of sedition or any other charge.  

Disappointed by the failure of the Grand National Holiday, Harney moved to Ayrshire, Scotland, where he married Mary Cameron. Harney's exile did not last long and the following year he became the Chartist organizer in Sheffield. During the strikes of 1842 Harney was one of the 58 Chartists arrested and tried at Lancaster in March 1843. After his conviction was reversed on appeal, Harney became a journalist for O'Connor's Northern Star. Two years later he became the editor of the newspaper.   

Tristram Hunt describes him during this period:George Julian Harney, Chartism's enfant terrible ... was firmly on the radical side of the movement, advocating the use of physical force and enjoying riling his conservative comrades by flaunting the red cap of liberty at public meetings. In and out of jail, endlessly feuding with fellow Chartists, and ultimately expelled from the party, the Robespierre-admiring Harney remained convinced that insurrection was the surest route to achieve the demands of the charter.

According to Dorothy Thompson, Harney:  is a particularly good figure to take as central to the study of Chartism. For five years (1845–50) he was the editor of the Northern Star. He was one of the few leading figures who entered the movement in its earliest days–coming in straight from an active part in the dramatic and principled fight against the stamp duties on newspapers which is one of the highlights of 19th century radical action–and remained active throughout the years of its mass influence.

Association with Marx and Engels
Harney became interested in the international struggle for universal suffrage and helped establish the Fraternal Democrats in September 1845. It was through this organisation that Harney met Karl Marx and Friedrich Engels. Harney persuaded both men to write articles for the Northern Star. Excited by the Continental Revolutions of 1848, Harney traveled to Paris in March, 1848 to meet members of the provisional government.

According to his friend and fellow radical, John Bedford Leno, Harney was:

"more conversant with foreign politics than any man I ever knew, and the first inquiries made by foreign refugees on landing on our shores was to forward the discovery of his whereabouts."

Involvement with Socialism

Harney was now a Socialist and he used the Northern Star to promote this philosophy. O'Connor, the newspaper's owner, disagreed with socialism and he pressurized Harney into resigning as editor. Harney now formed his own newspaper, the Red Republican. With the help of his friend, Ernest Charles Jones, Harney attempted to use his paper to educate his working class readers about socialism and proletarian internationalism.  In 1847 Harney stood as the Chartist candidate against Lord Palmerston for the seat of Tiverton, an event described by Engels in an article for La Reforme thus:

"It will be recalled that at the last elections Mr. Harney, editor-in-chief of the Northern Star, was put forward as the Chartist candidate for Tiverton, a borough which is represented in Parliament by Lord Palmerston, the Foreign Secretary. Mr. Harney, who won on the show of hands, decided to retire when Lord Palmerston demanded a poll" 

Harney's speech at the Hustings was published in full in the Northern Star and reprinted and distributed widely in Chartist circles <>

In 1850 the Red Republican published the first English translation of The Communist Manifesto The translation was done by Helen Macfarlane, a journalist, socialist and feminist of the time, who wrote for the Red Republican under the pseudonym Howard Morton. The Red Republican was not a financial success and was closed down in December 1850. Harney followed it with the Friend of the People (December 1850 - April 1852), Star of Freedom (April 1852 - December 1852) and The Vanguard (January 1853 - March 1853).

After The Vanguard ceased publication Harney moved to Newcastle and worked for Joseph Cowen's newspaper, the Northern Tribune and after traveling to meet French socialists living in exile in Jersey, Harney became editor of the Jersey Independent. Harney's support for the North in the American Civil War upset the owner of the Jersey Independent and in November 1862 Harney was forced to resign.

Emigration to United States and return to England

In May 1863 Harney emigrated to the United States. For the next 14 years he worked as a clerk in the Massachusetts State House. After his retirement he returned to England, where he wrote a weekly column for the Newcastle Chronicle. Harney died on 9 December 1897, aged 80. He is buried in Richmond Cemetery, south west London.

References

Sources
 http://www.spartacus-educational.com/CHharney.htm
 John Bedford Leno, The Aftermath: With Autobiography of the Author (Reeves & Turner, London 1892)

1817 births
1897 deaths
British Marxists
British prisoners and detainees
Chartists
People from Deptford
British socialists
Burials at Richmond Cemetery